PTIK Stadium is a football stadium in the City of South Jakarta, Indonesia. The stadium has a capacity of 3,000 people.

The stadium is owned by the Indonesian National Police. It is located in the center of POLRI Institute for Higher Learning (PTIK) and is the home base of PSJS Jakarta Selatan and Bhayangkara Football Club.

References

South Jakarta
Football venues in Indonesia
Athletics (track and field) venues in Indonesia
Multi-purpose stadiums in Indonesia
Sports venues in Jakarta
Football venues in Jakarta
Athletics (track and field) venues in Jakarta